"Love How It Hurts" is a song by English indie pop band Scouting for Girls. The song was originally intended to be released from the re-release of their second studio album, Everybody Wants to Be on TV (2010); however, the re-release was cancelled, so the song was instead issued as a standalone single and later included on the band's third album, The Light Between Us (2012). "Love How It Hurts" was released as a digital download on 10 July 2011 and debuted at number 17 on the UK Singles Chart the same month, becoming Scouting for Girls' final UK top-20 single.

Music video
The official music video to accompany the single "Love How It Hurts" was released on the band's website and YouTube on 27 May 2011. The music video shows a young geeky boy falling in love with a pretty girl as they soon started to become friends a cool bad boy comes over and takes the girl away. The geeky boy tried to give her a tape holding 'Love How It Hurts' on it. Yet again the cool boy interrupts and breaks it apart. Next they have all grown up and he is still in love with her. The geeky boy runs to meet her, intercut with scenes of the girl and geeky boy. He tries to marry her and (yet again) the cool boy interrupts, throws the ring off a nearby cliff and tries to walk off with the girl again. The music video ends when the girl stops walking and looks back at him.

The band do not feature in the video, a first for them. Roy Stride said this was due to them touring Germany and that: "The record label just decided to make it without us!". The band made two 'Alternative Endings' to the video, and fans were to pick their favourite. It features bassist Greg as the geeky boy and leader singer Roy as the bad boy fighting over the girl, played by drummer Pete. It was filmed at a service station on their way back from a gig and according to their Twitter, "Total Budget £9.36".

Track listing

Personnel
Performance credits
 Vocals: Roy Stride, Greg Churchouse
 Bass: Greg Churchouse
 Percussion: Pete Ellard
 Piano: Roy Stride
 Guitar: Roy Stride

Technical credits
 Production: Andy Green

Charts

Release history

References

External links
 

Scouting for Girls songs
2011 singles
2011 songs
Songs written by Roy Stride
Sony Music singles